Reto Wyss (born 22 May 1952) is a Swiss rower. He competed in the men's quadruple sculls event at the 1976 Summer Olympics.

References

1952 births
Living people
Swiss male rowers
Olympic rowers of Switzerland
Rowers at the 1976 Summer Olympics
Place of birth missing (living people)